The 2021 Women's Afrobasket qualification occurred on various dates on 2021 to determine which African national basketball teams would qualify for the 2021 Women's Afrobasket. Teams compete with other teams in their respective "zones" for a spot in the championship tournament.

Zone 1
Four teams were scheduled to compete, but Algeria, Morocco and Libya withdrew before the tournament, so the original host Tunisia qualified.

Zone 2
Two teams played a home-and away series to determine the qualified team.

Overview

Results

Zone 3
Six teams were scheduled to compete, but Ghana, Togo, Benin, Niger and Burkina Faso did not register for the tournament, so Ivory Coast qualified.

Zone 5
Four teams played a round robin to determine the qualified team. It was held in Kigali, Rwanda between 14 and 17 July 2021. Kenya become the champions after defeating Egypt 99–83 in the final.

Preliminary round

Semi-finals

Third place game

Final

Zone 6
Three teams were scheduled to compete, but Botswana and Zimbabwe did not register for the tournament, so Angola qualified.

References

External links 
2021 FIBA Women's Afrobasket Qualifiers

qualification
2021 in African basketball